Stevenson Memorial Hospital is located in the New Tecumseth community of Alliston, Ontario. The hospital is considered a medium-size community hospital with 41 in-patient beds and many outpatient services. in the 2019-2020 fiscal year there were 2,627 inpatient stays with an average length of stay of 4.2 days, and 35,500 emergency department visits.

T.P. Loblaw donated the funds to create the hospital in 1928 as a tribute to his grandparents, William and Elizabeth Stevenson. The hospital is led by CEO Jody Levac. Jody is the third CEO to come from Southlake Regional Health Center through a management services agreement.
The hospital Board in August 2018  completed an Executive Compensation framework and now directly employs the CEO role. The hospital is fully accredited and has some of the highest patient satisfaction scores for maternity in the province. It also has one of the fastest Emergency pay for performance records. The hospital is in the planning stage of a future expansion. The hospital provides care and treats patients from New Tecumseth, Adjala-Tosorontio, CFB Borden & Essa Township. The hospital also provides care and treatment to residents from a portion of Dufferin County.

Patient services
Acute Care
Birthing Suite
Day Surgery
Diagnostic Imaging
Emergency
Laboratory
Mental Health Services
Outpatient Clinics
Pharmacy
Physiotherapy Services

Helipad

A ground level helipad is located to the south of the water tower and requires ambulance transfer to get to the hospital's emergency department.

References

External links

Heliports in Ontario
Hospitals in Simcoe County
Buildings and structures in Simcoe County
Hospital buildings completed in 1928
Hospitals established in 1928
Certified airports in Ontario